William Murdoch Adamson (12 April 1881 – 25 October 1945) was a British Labour politician.

He was a National Officer of the Transport and General Workers' Union. In 1902 he married Jennie Johnston, later Member of Parliament for Dartford and Bexley.

He was Labour Member of Parliament (MP) for Cannock, in Staffordshire from 1922 to 1931 and from 1935 to 1945. He served in government as a Lord Commissioner of HM Treasury from 1941 to 1944.

References

External links 
 
 

1881 births
1945 deaths
Labour Party (UK) MPs for English constituencies
Ministers in the Churchill wartime government, 1940–1945
Transport and General Workers' Union-sponsored MPs
UK MPs 1922–1923
UK MPs 1923–1924
UK MPs 1924–1929
UK MPs 1929–1931
UK MPs 1935–1945
Workers' Union-sponsored MPs